Beast is the debut and only studio album by American rapper V.I.C. It was released on August 26, 2008, through Warner Bros. Records and Reprise Records. Recording sessions took place at ColliPark Studio in Atlanta and at Bionic Studios in Milwaukee. Production was handled by Mr. Collipark, the Package Store and Soulja Boy. It features guest appearances from Bun B, E-40, Hurricane Chris, Jermaine Dupri, Polow da Don, Soulja Boy and Unk. The album peaked at number 73 on the Billboard 200, number 12 on the Top R&B/Hip-Hop Albums chart, and number 7 on the Top Rap Albums chart. It was supported by two singles: "Get Silly" and "Wobble", both went charted on Billboard Hot 100 at numbers 29 and 94, respectively.

Track listing

Charts

References

External links

2008 debut albums
Reprise Records albums
Southern hip hop albums
Albums produced by Mr. Collipark
Hip hop albums by American artists